Szadzenie is a regional phonological feature of the Polish language. It consists in replacement or merger of dental affricates  ⟨c, dz⟩ and dental fricatives  ⟨s, z⟩ into their retroflex counterparts i.e. retroflex affricates  ⟨cz, dż⟩ and retroflex fricatives  ⟨sz, ż/rz⟩, respectively. This phenomenon is common in areas which border mazurating dialects, for instance the Suwałki Region.

See also 
 Polish phonology
 Mazurzenie

References 

Sound changes
Slavic phonologies
Polish dialects